Zone 39 (The Zone) is a 1996 Australian science fiction psychological drama film directed by John Tatoulis. It stars Carolyn Bock, Peter Phelps and William Zappa, and runs for 93 minutes.

Plot

The film tells the story of a future where the environment has been ravaged, leaving the world desolate. Two surviving factions, the New Territories and the Federal Republics, have been at war for 40 years. Finally, they have agreed to peace terms thanks to the efforts of the Central Union (CU). One of the security experts for the CU, Anne (Bock), decodes the encrypted messages of her boss, only to discover that one of the security zones has suffered a deadly contamination. Mysteriously, she dies shortly thereafter, leaving her soldier husband Leo (Phelps) devastated.

To recuperate, Leo is assigned to guard duty at the border outpost named Zone 39. The remainder of the film deals with Leo's struggle to cope with isolation and the death of his wife. She appears to him in hallucinations, perhaps brought on by the tranquillizers he has been taking.

Cast
Peter Phelps ... Leo Megaw
Carolyn Bock ... Nova Anne
William Zappa ... Sharp
Bradley Byquar ... Boas
Jane Seletto ... Dead Baby

Production
The film was shot at Crawford Studios in Melbourne. Director John Tatoulis:
In Zone 39, I was exploring a couple of things. One was the way in which a person deals with grief, the loss of a loved on. I truly believe that someone doesn't die until we stop thinking about that person. I think once we forget that person, once that person ceases to live in our memories, then that person is truly dead. Often it takes a long time for that person to truly die in people's hearts. I wanted to explore this theme in an environment that I think we're heading towards, one of being like a society that is particularly unfriendly to the individual and particularly isolates the individual and controls that individual.

References

External links
Zone 39 at Oz Movies

1990s science fiction drama films
1996 films
Australian psychological drama films
Australian science fiction drama films
1990s English-language films
1990s psychological drama films
Films shot in Melbourne
1996 drama films
1990s Australian films